Jack Higgins (1929–2022) was a British novelist.

Jack Higgins may also refer to:
Sir Jack Higgins (RAF officer) (1875–1948), British Royal Air Force air marshal
Jack Higgins (Gaelic footballer) (1903–1955), Irish Gaelic footballer
Jack Higgins (rugby league), British rugby league footballer of the 1940s
Jack Higgins (cartoonist) (born 1954), American cartoonist
Jack Higgins (Australian footballer) (born 1999), Australian rules footballer

See also
John Higgins (disambiguation)